The Six Chuter Skye Ryder Aerochute is an American powered parachute that was designed and produced by Six Chuter of Yakima, Washington. Now out of production, when it was available the aircraft was supplied as a kit for amateur construction.

Design and development
The Skye Ryder Aerochute was designed to comply with the US FAR 103 Ultralight Vehicles two-seat trainer exemption as well as the Experimental - Amateur-built aircraft rules. It features a  parachute-style wing, two-seats-in-tandem accommodation, tricycle landing gear and a single  Rotax 503 engine in pusher configuration. The aircraft was also sold as a single-seater with a  wing.

The aircraft carriage is built from metal tubing. In flight steering is accomplished via foot pedals that actuate the canopy brakes, creating roll and yaw. On the ground the aircraft has lever-controlled nosewheel steering. The main landing gear incorporates spring rod suspension.

The manufacturer estimated the construction time from the supplied kit as 30 hours.

Operational history
By 1998 the company reported that 1064 kits had been sold and 1058 aircraft were completed and flying.

In April 2015 seven examples were registered in the United States with the Federal Aviation Administration.

Specifications (Skye Ryder Aerochute)

References

External links

Skye Ryder Aerochute
1990s United States sport aircraft
1990s United States ultralight aircraft
Single-engined pusher aircraft
Powered parachutes